Charles Trevor Lawrence, 2nd Baron Trevethin, DSO, DL, MA (29 May 1879-25 June 1959) was a peer of the British Realm.

He was the eldest surviving son of Alfred Lawrence, 1st Baron Trevethin,a British lawyer and judge who served as Lord Chief Justice of England from 1921 to 1922 ; and the brother of Geoffrey Lawrence, 1st Baron Oaksey, the main British Judge during the Nuremberg trials after World War II, and President of the Judicial group.

He was educated at Haileybury and New College, Oxford. He then served with distinction in the Royal Horse Artillery: during World War I he was Mentioned in despatches three times and awarded the DSO and the Order of St. Anna. He was made a Deputy Lieutenant of Breconshire in 1949.

Arms

References

1879 births
1959 deaths
Barons in the Peerage of the United Kingdom
Royal Artillery officers
Alumni of New College, Oxford
Deputy Lieutenants of Brecknockshire
Recipients of the Order of St. Anna, 2nd class